The Litopys UPA volume series was created under the auspices of the Litopys UPA Publishing Company, an Ontario Corporation Without Share Capital incorporated in 1978. Publishing primary source, archival material and documents, and first person accounts that relate to the military history of the Ukrainian Insurgent Army UPA, underground resistance organizations, as well as the history of Ukraine during World War II and post war decade. Each volume or group of volumes is devoted to a specific theme. Some deal with the military history in a specific period of time or region - for example, in Volyn, in Halychyna, as in the regions of Ukraine under Poland and so on. Two, three, or more volumes may be devoted to specicific themes. Memoirs, or books by individual authors dealing with particular questions offer insight into individual topics. Ukrainian language with English introductions.

Books

Main series

All of these URLs are bad. The correct ones can be found on Litopys's orientation page to the series.

New series

Litopys UPA - Library

Series "Events and People"

The graves of insurgents

Other related books

The 100 Book Catalogue Summary

Administration in Canada and USA

B. Kowalyk, R. Kulyk, Z. Brozyna

Editors and Administration in Ukraine

M. Romaniuk - editor-in-chief, A. Sova - deputy editor, I. Homziak, B. Stoliar - administration

References

External links
 Official site
 Honoring the memory of rank-and-file fighters

Ukrainian Insurgent Army
Publishing companies of Canada
Publishing companies of Ukraine